Platysolenites is a genus of agglutinated foraminifera known from Ediacaran and lower Cambrian assemblages.

Further reading
 Platysolenites is shown to extend below the first appearance of P. antiquissimus in the Neoproterozoic-Cambrian boundary stratotype region, SE Newfoundland, and to occur at higher stratigraphic levels in Wales and Finnmark.

References

External links
How old are Feraminfern from the University of Bonn.

Foraminifera genera
Paleozoic life of Newfoundland and Labrador